The Chapel of St. Bernard is a closed Roman Catholic parish church under the authority of the Roman Catholic Archdiocese of New York, located in Towners, Putnam County, New York, USA. The parish was established as a mission of St. Lawrence O'Toole in Brewster in 1875 and closed in 1957.

References 

Religious organizations established in 1875
1957 disestablishments in New York (state)
Roman Catholic churches in New York (state)
Churches in Putnam County, New York
Closed churches in the Roman Catholic Archdiocese of New York
Roman Catholic chapels in the United States